Culturally relevant teaching or responsive teaching is a pedagogy grounded in teachers' practice of cultural competence, or skill at teaching in a cross-cultural or multicultural setting. Teachers using this method encourage each student to relate course content to their cultural context.

While the term often deals specifically with instruction of African American students in the United States, it has been proven to be an effective form of pedagogy for students of all racial and ethnic backgrounds. For instance, in Canada, research reflects the need to bridge the gap between traditional Aboriginal education and Western education systems by including spirituality in Aboriginal educational practices.  By making education culturally relevant, it is thought to improve academic achievement. Although the majority of this practice is undertaken in a primary or secondary school setting, Baumgartner and Johnson-Bailey  have experienced the implementation and discussions of culturally relevant teaching within a higher education environment.

Historical Context
Culturally relevant teaching was made popular by Dr. Gloria Ladson-Billings in the early 1990s. The term she created was defined as one "that empowers students to maintain cultural integrity, while succeeding academically".  Culturally relevant pedagogy can also be found in the literature as "culturally appropriate" (Au & Jordan, 1981), "culturally congruent" (Mohatt & Erickson, 1981), "culturally responsive" (Au, 2009; Cazden & Leggett, 1981; Erickson & Mohatt, 1982; Lee, 1998), and "culturally compatible" (Jordan, 1985; Vogt, Jordan & Tharp, 1987).  Ladson-Billings (1992) also provides some clarification between critical and culturally relevant pedagogy, with the difference being that culturally relevant pedagogy urges collective action grounded in cultural understanding, experiences, and ways of knowing the world. This has become more widely known and accepted in the education field. For example, the U.S. Department of Education's Equity Assistance Centers, such as the Equity Alliance at ASU help states, school districts and schools to establish the conditions for equitable educational outcomes for all students, using cultural responsiveness as one of the measures of the needed capabilities of teachers, principals and school communities as a whole. 
The theory surrounding culturally relevant teaching is connected to a larger body of knowledge on multicultural education and helping culturally diverse students excel in education. Researchers argue that there are gaps in academic achievement between mainstream culture and immigrants or ethnic cultural groups. Early theories suggest, the disconnect between these groups were due to student/teacher language difficulties or that ethnic cultures don't value education as heavily as the Western culture does.  Often placing, culturally diverse students unnecessarily in special education classes simply because of linguistic and cultural differences. In response to these challenges, some researchers and teachers believe that education should be adapted to "match the cultures students bring with them from home". One key educational researcher who has contributed significantly to the progression of culturally relevant teaching is Geneva Gay.  In her landmark book, Culturally Responsive Teaching: Theory, Research, and Practice, Geneva Gay expanded the traditional view of culture beyond race and ethnicity.  She wrote, "Even without being consciously aware of it, culture determines how we think, believe, and behave". In other words, culture is a student's beliefs, motivations, and even social groups and norms.  Thus, the teacher who practices culturally relevant teaching understands that culture manifests in a variety of adaptations within how students prefer to learn.  A culturally responsive teacher uses differentiated instruction to tailor learning to every aspect of a student's culture.

Many of these researchers and educators support the constructivist theories of education because such perspectives recognize the value of multiple cultural viewpoints. In constructivism, learners are taught to question, challenge, and critically analyze information rather than blindly accept what it taught; which leads to exactly the type of teaching advocated by the originators of culturally relevant teaching.  James Banks lays out 5 dimensions of multicultural education.  These dimensions laid the foundation for the move toward culturally relevant teaching.  The first dimension is content integration where teachers make a conscious effort to represent a variety of cultures in the curriculum and teaching.  The second dimension of knowledge construction asks learners to begin questioning and critically analyzing the biased, and previously accepted, curriculum.  In the third dimension, the teaching focus shifts to encouraging cross-cultural interactions in an effort to reduce prejudice.  By the fourth dimension, equitable pedagogy, the teacher uses culturally relevant teaching to change teaching approaches.  The purpose of Banks' fourth dimension is to tailor teaching methods to ensure success of students from all cultures.  If successful, the fourth dimension and culturally relevant teaching will manifest into Banks' fifth dimension of an empowered school culture.  It is in this stage when teachers and learners critically examine the institution of education for inequities. Banks' fourth and fifth dimensions are the perfect example of culturally relevant teaching.  Teachers who achieve these dimensions, and thus fully realize the impact of culturally relevant teaching, cherish learners who question, seek answers through inquiry, and embrace a mindset of social justice.  All of which are the key components of constructivism.

James Scheurich believes culturally relevant pedagogy has a significant importance on our youth because it benefits students no matter what the ethnic background or culture of the students. He explained how the success of the nation is in the hands of children and in a society where students of color will no longer be the minority and how teachers must teach to their audience in order for students to be successful.

Characteristics 

A number of authors, including Gay and Lipman have identified characteristics of culturally responsive teaching. These characteristics are:

Validating and Affirming: Culturally responsive teaching is validating and affirming because it acknowledges the strengths of students' diverse heritages.
Comprehensive: Culturally responsive teaching is comprehensive because it uses "cultural resources to teach knowledge, skills, values, and attitudes".
Multidimensional: Culturally responsive teaching encompasses many areas and applies multicultural theory to the classroom environment, teaching methods, and evaluation.
Liberating: Culturally responsive teachers liberate students.
Empowering: Culturally responsive teaching empower students, giving them opportunities to excel in the classroom and beyond. "Empowerment translates into academic competence, personal confidence, courage, and the will to act".
Transformative: Culturally responsive teaching is transformative because educators and their students must often defy educational traditions and the status quo.

In the context of British university business schools, in 2013, Jabbar and Hardaker proposed a five pillar framework that is designed to support academics in understanding the pertinent aspects of developing pedagogy for students from culturally and ethnically diverse backgrounds in UK Higher Education.

Principles of culturally relevant pedagogy
Principles of culturally relevant pedagogy (CRP) include:
Identity Development: Good teaching comes from those who are true to their identity (including genetic, socioeconomic, educational and cultural influences) and integrity (self-acceptance).  Teachers who are comfortable with themselves and teach within their identity and integrity are able to make student connections and bring subjects alive.  It is critical for the student-teacher connection when implementing Culturally Relevant Pedagogy.
Equity and Excellence: Within this principle the following concepts are addressed: "dispositions, incorporation of multicultural curriculum content, equal access, and high expectations". The integration of excellence and equity in CRP is predicated upon establishing a curriculum that is inclusive of students' cultural experiences, and setting high expectations for the students to reach. 
Developmental Appropriateness: Several concepts collectively define Developmental Appropriateness within the context of CRP. These concepts include, "...learning styles, teaching styles, and cultural variation in psychological needs (motivation, morale, engagement, collaboration)". The goal is to assess students' cognitive development progress and incorporate learning activities within the lesson plan that are challenging and culturally relevant.
Teaching the Whole Child: Similar to 'Developmental Appropriateness', 'Teaching the Whole Child' is a theme that includes the concepts of "skill development in a cultural context, home-school-community collaboration, learning outcomes, supportive learning community and empowerment". When teaching a child wholly, educators must be cognizant of the socio-cultural influences that have attributed to the learning progress of that child even before they enter the classroom. These outside influences must naturally be accounted for when designing a culturally relevant curriculum.
Student Teacher Relationships: The theme of Student-Teacher Relationship within the context of CRP aligns itself closely with the concepts of "caring, relationships, interaction, and classroom atmosphere". Educators must combine the willingness to bond with their students with the desire to grow that relationship into one vested in personal care and professional vigilance. Students must feel that the teacher has their best interest at heart to succeed in implementing CRP.
Manage Student Emotions: When teaching adult learners it is also important to exhibit Culturally Relevant Pedagogies.  Educators must be prepared to manage students that may have strong emotional experiences to culturally diverse readings  Positive emotions may enhance the learning experience, whereas negative emotions may cause discourse and prevent students from engaging.  Educators should explore strong emotions, particularly in adult learners, and use it as a cultural teachable moment.

Suggested teaching strategies
 Create an accommodating and inviting classroom culture to reach diverse audiences. Teachers must demonstrate that they care for their students and their cultural needs, because a genuine attitude of interest is likely to yield positive emotions that empower and motivate students.
 Be attentive to the "symbolic curriculum," or visuals displayed in the classroom which can "teach students knowledge, skills, morals, and values" over time (108). Geneva Gay suggests teachers "ensure that the images displayed in the classrooms represent a wide variety of age, gender, time, place, social class, and positional diversity within and across ethnic groups" (108-109). For instance, to support biracial children in the classroom, a teacher could display a large visual of various individuals involved in a school (teachers, nurse, school counselors, janitors, children, bus drivers, vice principals, etc.) and a caption that encompasses the saying, "The Beauty of All People."
 Use reciprocal teaching, where students and teachers take turns leading the class discussions. In this method, the students' voices are heard and the classroom teacher becomes more of a facilitator than a "director". Students are autonomous in their own learning and feel more empowered. Reciprocal teaching gives students the opportunity to express the course material from their cultural viewpoints, which is very important according to the constructivist and progressive educator.
 Discipline-specific culturally relevant teaching strategies can also be used. For example:
 In history classes, students might compare and contrast modern and historical viewpoints and responses on selected issues or topics. For example, throughout history and in the modern world, family and household composition, housing, and food traditions have varied across cultures, socioeconomic groups, and ethnicities. By introducing these social history themes or other relevant topics in a historical context, discussion and critical analysis can take place on three levels: students compare and contrast human experiences in their own lives and experience, in the wider modern culture, and in the past. 
 In social science classes such as sociology or anthropology, students might examine how different races, ethnicities, and socio-economic groups in the past and present define appropriate behavior, such as manners, etiquette, or what is viewed as polite behavior. Within different cultures, students can also explore how gender influences expectations for polite behavior.
 Be cognizant of the tourist approach when developing a culturally competent curriculum. For example, do not try to revolve lessons around indigenous peoples only during Thanksgiving or Latinos only during Cinco de Mayo.
 Recognizing the need for cultural authenticity and cross-cultural understanding, Professor Jonda C. McNair suggests that pairing historical and contemporary grade middle-novels could help students understand how history shaped the world of today.
 Cooperative learning methods can be effective in promoting culturally relevant learning. Rather than fostering competitiveness among students, group learning strategies encourage collaboration in the completion of assignments. Students learn to work together towards common goals and learn important skills such as teamwork, and embracing other learning styles.
 Collaborative games and cross-cultural activities allow students personal interaction with different cultures. For instance, in the three-hour game, "Ba Fa Ba Fa", students participate in one of two very different cultures and must learn the languages and customs of that cultural group. Similar to this activity, is the program "Tribes" implemented into many elementary classrooms, to help students understand their school and classroom as unique and diverse communities.
 Have discussions amongst students about individual differences. While recognizing students' uncertainties about identities that are unfamiliar, promote the importance of curiosity and answer questions they have about different identities when possible. Center the discussion around not only physical characteristics of students and their families, but also family types. Invite any families who are available to come to class for students to see and learn about differences.
 Family history research encourages students interview family members and learn about familial cultural influences on their own lives. Documenting interviews in reflective writing helps students to explore their beliefs and cultural assumptions. Meta-reflection through these activities is very important to student learning, about themselves and their peers. Students may choose to write about their cultural identity and its connection with their educational experiences, or they may choose to look at a different culture altogether, which they have learned about from a peer. Learning about new cultures through this activity can be very engaging for students.
 Additional strategies for culturally relevant or responsive teaching are as follows:
 Create a positive learning environment:  attentive skills, teaching skills, and teacher/student interaction (Radical Pedagogy, 2003).
 Utilize a diverse curriculum (Gollnick and Chinn, 2013).
 Know, understand, and work with families that come from different race and ethnicities (Gonzalez-Mena and Pulido-Tobiassen, 1999).
 Expose children to role models from their own culture as well as those from other cultures (Gonzalez-Mena and Pulido-Tobiassen, 1999).
 Utilize student's cultures to help them learn the subjects and skills taught in school (Gollnick and Chinn, 2013).
 Start teaching multi-cultural education to students at an early age (Russel, 2007).
 Use literacy and children's books in the classroom to promote culturally relevant teaching. By using texts that have characters of all different backgrounds, students can easily learn about new cultures (Ladson-Billings, 1992).

Maintaining relationships
Gloria Ladson-Billings has several research projects and articles where she interviewed educators at diverse schools. She mainly focused on low socioeconomic schools. After identifying several exceptional teachers in public schools in low-socioeconomic, mostly African American school districts, Ladson-Billings spent time observing and trying to explain their success with students who are typically pushed to the margins by public education, finding that all of the teachers shared pride in and commitment to their profession and had an underlying belief that all children could be successful. The participating teachers maintained relationships with their students that were "fluid and equitable" and often attended community events in order to demonstrate support for their students. These teachers also believed in creating bonds with students and developing a "community of learners," which means that all students worked collaboratively to become responsible for each other's learning. Ladson-Billings maintains that in order for teachers to use culturally relevant pedagogy successfully, they must also show respect for students and "understand the need for the students to operate in the dual worlds of their home community and the white community".

There have been many studies done in response to how students respond to teachers that exhibit the above characteristics, incorporating the principles and use of these strategies within the classroom. For instance, Tyrone C. Howard looked at the "perceptions and interpretations" of students who have experienced this type of learning environment. The qualitative data which included students response, is evidence that this is a positive and effective form of pedagogy.

Using technology to promote CRT
Optimistically, technology offers the unique chance for educators to bridge the curriculum of school to the 21st century learner, as culturally relevant teaching intends. The most significant barrier to the implementation of culturally relevant teaching has been the prevailing disconnect between school learning and the real-world needs of students particularly minority students.  Yet, when used correctly, "computer technology can provide students with an excellent tool for applying concepts in a variety of contexts, thereby breaking the artificial isolation of school subject matter from the real-world situations" Technology permeates the real-world environment of the 21st century student.  It is literally integral in the culture of the digital native learner.  According to their literature review, Conole et al. found that for today's students, technology is transferable, integrated, personalized, organized, adaptive, and pervasive.  Today's student is continuously connected and in many cases far more of an expert than their teacher.  Thus, if schools utilize technology, the curriculum becomes truly relevant and responsive to the learner of the 21st century.  In school learning mirrors the learning they engage in outside of school.

With technology, students possess the ability to connect and interact with colleagues, across the globe, who share their views and beliefs.  In interviews, digital natives report that, "lost cost communication technologies such as Skype, MSN chat, and email were considered invaluable forms of communication". With technology, learners are able to form social groups and engage in cross-cultural interactions that provide instant feedback and learning challenges beyond the capacity of a single textbook, classroom, or neighborhood.  These cross-cultural interactions, nearly impossible before global technologies, lead to the depth of questioning and critical thought needed to be successful in the 21st century, global society.  In short, students use social networking and technological connections to connect with social and cultural peers but ultimately engage in interactions with members of a variety of cultural groups.  These interactions can be quite empowering for modern learners.

The 21st century learner is what Neil Selwyn refers to as an, "empowered digital native".  This empowered learner is no longer held hostage to the culturally insensitive curriculum of public schools.  In contrast, they are proficient at using technology to tailor their own learning.  Within seconds, learners can access a wealth of information and knowledge and no longer must trust solely the limited perspective presented in their textbook. The 21st century learner is accustomed to using technology to challenge preconceived information.  "Research indicates that computer technology can help support learning, and that it is especially useful in developing the higher-order skills of critical thinking analysis, and scientific inquiry".  Clearly, technology offers the potential of helping students achieve and benefit from culturally relevant teaching.

Despite the evidence supporting the use of technology, educators should be cautious of assuming technology will be a relevant vehicle for learning to all students alike. For instance, in lower income areas, such as rural America, an emphasis on high technology may be misguided. As a counterexample, a program in rural Virginia engages in culturally relevant teaching by explicitly avoiding high technology solutions and using locally relevant activities to guide learning. Specifically, fixing and using tools was used to teach engineering to rural middle school youth.

Challenges to culturally relevant teaching
Not all educators favor culturally relevant teaching. Indeed, there are many practical challenges to implementing culturally relevant pedagogy including a lack of enforcement of culturally relevant teaching methods, and the tendency to view students as individual units only, rather than seeing them as linked inseparably with their cultural groups. 
In culturally relevant pedagogy, new teachers must be taught how to adapt their curriculum, methodology, teaching methods, and instructional materials to connect with students' values and cultural norms. Therefore, another challenge for educators is to prepare reflective practitioners who can connect with diverse students and their families. Even though some schools of education acknowledge credibility in training culturally relevant educators, many wrestle with how fit such training into their program and "grudgingly add a diversity course to their curriculum". One contributor to this reluctance comes from the education professors' discomfort with or fear of addressing issues such as racism in their courses. "The student population of America's classrooms has changed. Currently, 43% of students in our nation's schools come from racially and ethnically diverse backgrounds. Latinos account for 20% of the school population and Blacks 17%. Nationally, white students now represent 57% of public school enrollment, down from 61% in the 1993–94 school year.  Given these demographics, Kenneth Fasching-Varner and Vanessa Dodo-Seriki have suggested that disconnects in teacher and student identity lead to "Free and Reduced Pedagogy", or a non-student first approach that reduces students to cultural differences, discrediting students based on their identitites and differences in identities between teachers and students. In the largest school districts, half or more of the students are non-white. Demographic projections predict that cultural and ethnic diversity will increase. Students of color will become the majority in the United States by 2023".

Examples of culturally relevant teaching programs
Advancement Via Individual Determination (AVID) is a program from the San Diego (California) public schools that helps under-represented students (including those from different cultural groups) by mixing low-achieving students with high-achieving students in college preparation programs. "AVID employs many principles of cooperative learning in its 'writing, inquiry, and collaboration' approach to curriculum and instruction".

The Umoja Community is a California-based group that roots itself in the principles and practices of culturally relevant teaching. Umoja works with students, colleges and the community to promote awareness, instill values and provide the foundations needed to achieve success, particularly for African American students, although it is committed to helping all students. The Umoja Community is recognized by the California Community Colleges System Board of Directors and helps serve over 2,000 students a year.

The Russian Mission School in Alaska incorporates Native American culture with the standard curriculum and emphasizes hands-on activities that are relevant to their local lifestyle.

Toronto (Ontario, Canada) is currently using arts-education with other pedagogies, including Purpose Driven Education, to encourage authenticity, reclaiming personal power, and self-love through exploration of one's own familial and ethnic history.

In The Dreamkeepers: Successful Teachers of African American Children, Gloria Ladson-Billings presents several examples of excellent culturally relevant teaching in African American classrooms.

References

External links
 INTIME: Culturally Responsive Teaching
 Pinto, Laura E (2013). From Discipline to Culturally Responsive Engagement: 45 Classroom Management Strategies. 

Curricula
Educational psychology
Pedagogy
Critical pedagogy